Antalya Centennial Archery Field is an archery field located in Antalya, Turkey.

Situated in Meltem neighborhood, the archery field on lawn has the dimensions , where 50 targets can be placed. İt has a seating capacity for 500 spectators. The venue was leased to the Antalya Archery Club (Antalya Okçuluk İhtisas Kulübü) on November 17, 1998, for 49 years by its owner, the Directorate General of Youth and Sports.

The facility has also offices, lounge area and a meeting room. It is also home to Antalya Anadolu Archery Club (Antalaya Anadolu Okçuluk Kulübü).

The venue hosts the FITA Archery World Cup competitions organized by the World Archery Federation (WAF) and run by the Turkish Archery Federation since 2006.

International events
 2006 Grand Prix (2nd leg) - June 7–10
 2007 European Grand Prix (2nd leg) / Archery World Cup (Stage 3) - May 29-June 2
 2008 European Grand Prix (2nd leg) / World Cup (Stage 3) - May 27–31
 10th World Junior Outdoor Target Championships & 4th World Cadet Outdoor Target Championships - October 6–11, 2008
 2009 European Grand Prix (3rd leg) & FITA World Cup (Stage 3) - June 2–7
 2010 World Cup (Stage 2) - June 6–12
 2011 European Archery Grand Prix (1st leg) - April 11–16
 2011 World Cup (Stage 2) - June 6–12
 2012 World Cup (Stage 2) - May 1–6
 2013 World Cup (Stage 2) - June, 10-16
 2013 World Archery Championships - September 27–28

References

Archery venues
Archery in Turkey
Sports venues in Antalya
Sports venues completed in 1998